Jean-Paul Beugnot (25 June 1931 – 7 February 2001) was a French professional basketball player and coach. Standing at 2.07 m (6' 9 ") tall, Beugnot played at the power forward and center positions. He was named one of FIBA's 50 Greatest Players, in 1991. He was inducted into the French Basketball Hall of Fame in 2004. He was awarded the Glory of Sport in 2013.

Club career

Playing career
During his playing career, Beugnot played with the French club Étoile Charleville-Mézières (1955–1967). With Étoile Charleville-Mézières, he won two French League championships (1958 and 1960), and two French Cups (1958 and 1959). He was also the Best Scorer of the French League's 1962–63 season.

Coaching career
Beugnot also worked in Étoile Charleville-Mézières, as a player-coach. He was the club's head coach (1956–1958).

National team career
Beugnot was a member of the senior French national basketball team. With France, he played in 98 games (1951–1961) scoring a total of 1,072 points. He played at the 1952 Summer Olympic Games, at the 1956 Summer Olympic Games, and at the 1960 Summer Olympic Games.

He also played at the 1954 FIBA World Championship, at the EuroBasket 1955, and at the EuroBasket 1961.

Managerial career
After his playing career, Beugnot worked in the French Basketball Federation committee (1976–1985). He was also the federation's Vice-President (1988–1992).

Personal life
Beugnot's sons, Éric and Grég, were also professional basketball players.

References

External links
FIBA Profile 1
FIBA Profile 2
FIBA Europe Profile
Légendes du Basket français - Jean-Paul Beugnot 
Jean-Paul Beugnot, l'intérieur généreux 

1931 births
2001 deaths
Sportspeople from Bas-Rhin
Étoile Charleville-Mézières coaches
Étoile Charleville-Mézières players
Centers (basketball)
French basketball coaches
French men's basketball players
Olympic basketball players of France
Basketball players at the 1952 Summer Olympics
Basketball players at the 1956 Summer Olympics
Basketball players at the 1960 Summer Olympics
Power forwards (basketball)
1954 FIBA World Championship players